Stari Grad is a settlement east of the town of Krško in eastern Slovenia. The area is part of the traditional region of Styria. It is now included with the rest of the municipality in the Lower Sava Statistical Region.

Name
The name of the settlement was changed from Stari Grad pri Vidmu to Stari Grad in 1990. In the past the German name was Altenhausen.

Mass grave
Stari Grad is the site of a mass grave from the end of the Second World War. The Stari Grad Mass Grave is located on the north side of the road from Krško to Brežice. It contains the remains of an unknown number of Croatian refugees.

Church
The local church is dedicated to Saint Nicholas and belongs to the Parish of Videm–Krško. It is a Baroque church, built in 1627 to commemorate the victims of the plague.

References

External links
Stari Grad on Geopedia

Populated places in the Municipality of Krško